Hassan Namazi (born in Qum from Azeri parents) is an Iranian Shiite cleric and politician. He is a member of the 4th Assembly of Experts from the West Azerbaijan electorate. Namazi won his membership with 360,952 votes.

See also 

 List of members in the Fourth Term of the Council of Experts

References

External links
 

People from Qom
Iranian Azerbaijanis
Members of the Assembly of Experts
Living people
1975 births
Presidential advisers of Iran